Major the Hon. Christopher William Lowther (18 January 1887 – 7 January 1935) was a British Conservative Party politician, the elder son of James Lowther, 1st Viscount Ullswater.

Lowther was educated at Eton College and Trinity College, Cambridge. He was commissioned into the Duke of Yorks Own Loyal Suffolk Hussars in 1909. He later transferred to the Westmorland and Cumberland Yeomanry, serving in the First World War. He served as an Assistant Provost Marshal from 1917 to 1919 and reached the rank of Major.

He married Ina Marjorie Gwendolin Pelly on 17 June 1910, by whom he had one son:
Lt. John Arthur Lowther (1910–1942)

He and Ina were divorced in 1921, and he married Dorothy Bromley-Davenport on 16 February 1921, by whom he had three daughters:
Hon. Rosemary Lowther (b. 25 February 1922 – 24 January 2021), married Lt. Douglas Goolden (1914–2001)
Christine Lowther (16 January 1927 – 4 August 1927)
Hon. Jennifer Lowther (b. 11 June 1932), married James Lowther, 7th Earl of Lonsdale on 9 September 1954, divorced 1962, later married William Edward Clayfield, Oswald Dickin Carter and James Cornelius Sullivan

In January 1921 Lowther defected to the Independent Parliamentary Group led by Horatio Bottomley.

References

External links 
 

1887 births
1935 deaths
People educated at Eton College
Alumni of Trinity College, Cambridge
Suffolk Yeomanry officers
Conservative Party (UK) MPs for English constituencies
British Army personnel of World War I
Heirs apparent who never acceded
UK MPs 1918–1922
Christopher
Westmorland and Cumberland Yeomanry officers